Topbar, South Dakota (also known as Top Bar), is a populated place in West Haakon  township in Haakon County, South Dakota, United States, near to Milesville, South Dakota and Philip, South Dakota.

History
Carrie Ingalls, younger sister of Laura Ingalls Wilder (Little House on the Prairie) was an independent young woman, and though single, she filed on a homestead claim in Top Bar, South Dakota. She met there her future husband; David N. Swanzey and his children.

References

Populated places in Haakon County, South Dakota